Barnyards (Scottish Gaelic:) is a small hamlet, located 1 mile north east of  Beauly in Inverness-shire, Scottish Highlands and is in the Scottish council area of Highland.

References

Populated places in Inverness committee area